Bhulanpur railway station is a small railway station in Varanasi, Uttar Pradesh. The code for the station is BHLP. With selective train stoppages, the station caters the local population.

References

External links

Railway stations in Varanasi
Lucknow NR railway division